Douglas Wilson (born 3 March 1994) is a Northern Irish footballer who plays as a midfielder for Ballymena United in the NIFL Premiership.

Career
Wilsons talents were spotted by Hull City youth scouts when he was playing as a youngster in Northern Ireland and he was soon brought over to England to join the Tigers' youth set-up.

A central midfielder, Wilson made a big impression for City's youth team and captained the side on a number of occasions as they won the Youth Alliance North East Conference title in 2012.

His performances earned the Northern Ireland under-17 and under-19 international a step-up to the club's Development Squad for 2012–13 and having impressed at reserve team level, he made his first team debut as a second-half substitute in an FA Cup tie against Leyton Orient in January 2013.
On 8 March 2013 Wilson joined Grimsby Town on loan for the remainder of the 2012–13 season.

Career statistics

References

External links

1994 births
Living people
Association footballers from Northern Ireland
Association football midfielders
Hull City A.F.C. players
Grimsby Town F.C. players
National League (English football) players
Northern Ireland youth international footballers
Northern Ireland under-21 international footballers
Sportspeople from County Armagh
Dungannon Swifts F.C. players
Ballymena United F.C. players